Franz Vollrath Carl Wilhelm Joseph von Bülow (11 September 1861 – 18 October 1915) was a German author, soldier and homosexual activist.

Life 
Franz Vollrath Carl Wilhelm Joseph von Bülow was born on 11 September 1861 in Frankfurt am Main of Imperial Germany. Bülow's father was Bernhard Vollrath von Bülow, chamberlain of Mecklenburg-Schwerin and envoy to the German Confederation's Bundesversammlung in Frankfurt am Main, while his mother was Paula, née von Linden. Bülow attended high schools in Schwerin and Waren for his studies. Following that, he completed cadet schools at Plön and Gross-Lichterfelde. Bülow had advanced to the rank of lieutenant by 1890. In the same year, he left the service and joined the South West Africa Company in the German colonial South West Africa. In the years that followed, he authored a book on his experiences in German South West Africa and Cecil Rhodes' politics, as well as the Herero and Namaqua genocide. Bülow was blinded by a gunshot wound and therefore returned to Germany. He married divorced Countess Konstanze Beust, née von Goldacker, in 1898, but they divorced a year later.

According to Magnus Hirschfeld, Bülow was one of the co-founders of the Scientific-Humanitarian Committee in Berlin, together with Magnus Hirschfeld, Eduard Oberg, and Max Spohr. Bülow moved to Venice in 1900, where homosexuality was legal, unlike in Germany. He lived near San Polo on the Grand Canal at the Palazzo Tiepolo. Bülow left Venice with the outbreak of World War I and returned to Germany, where he died on 18 October 1915, in Dresden.

References 

1861 births
1915 deaths
19th-century Prussian military personnel
Military personnel from Frankfurt
People of the Herero and Namaqua genocide
First homosexual movement
German LGBT rights activists